Calendrier Sportif was a 24-hour, French-language sports information radio station, which airs on XM Satellite Radio. On November 12, 2008, Calendrier Sportif was moved from channel 246 to channel 97.

Programming 
Calendrier Sportif features schedules on the various sporting events played on XM Radio. Unlike XM Sports Guide, the channel has its own audible content in French.  The channel is broadcast in low-fidelity, voice-only AMBE audio format like XM's Traffic and Weather channels.

See also
XM Scoreboard

External links
Calendrier Sportif website

XM Satellite Radio channels
Satellite radio stations in Canada
Digital-only radio stations
Sports radio stations in Canada
French-language radio stations in Canada
Radio stations established in 2007
Defunct radio stations in Canada